Brian Harrison Walker  is a scientist specialized in ecological sustainability and resilience in socio-ecological systems.

Education and academic career
Brian Walker began his scientific career in Rhodesia (now Zimbabwe), where his research was on ecosystem function and dynamics in tropical savannas and rangelands. He earned his Ph.D. in the University of Saskatchewan, in Canada in 1968.

He was a Lecturer and Senior Lecturer at the University of Rhodesia, Rhodesia from 1969 until 1975. After that he was a professor at the University of the Witwatersrand, before moving to Australia in 1985. There he became Chief of the former CSIRO Division of Wildlife and Ecology (now CSIRO Sustainable Ecosystems) from 1985-1999.

He has also made significant contributions to global change science. Serving as the Chair of the Scientific Steering Committee of the IGBP core project on Global Change and Terrestrial Ecosystems (GCTE), from 1990–1997 and Chair of the Board, Beijer International Institute of Ecological Economics, Royal Swedish Academy of Sciences from 1999-2002.

He is currently a Research Fellow with CSIRO Sustainable Ecosystems and is also Program Director and Chair of the Board of the Resilience Alliance, an international research group working on sustainability of social-ecological systems.

Publications
Brian Walker has co-authored two books and published more than 160 scientific papers. He also edited and co-edited nine books.

Books
2006 with David Salt: Resilience thinking: Sustaining ecosystems and people in a changing world, Island Press
2012 with David Salt: Resilience practice: Building capacity to absorb disturbance and maintain function, Island Press

His most cited papers include:
1981 with D. Ludwig, C. S. Holling and R Peterman. "Stability of semi-arid savanna grazing systems" Journal of Ecology Vol 69 : 473-498.
1985 with W.T. Knoop "Interactions of woody and herbaceous vegetation in southern African savanna" in Journal of Ecology Vol 73 : 235-253.
1989 with M. Westoby I. Noy-Meir. "Opportunistic management for rangelands not at equilibrium. in Journal of Range Management Vol 42(4) : 266-274.
1992 "Biodiversity and ecological redundancy" Conservation Biology Vol 6: 18-23.
2001 with M. Scheffer, S.R. Carpenter, J. Foley, and C. Folke. "Catastrophic shifts in ecosystems" in Nature Vol 413: 591-596.

Awards
In 1999, Brian Walker received the Ecological Society of Australia's Gold Medal for his work on ecology of tropical savannahs and rangelands.

In 2018, Brian Walker has been awarded the Blue Planet Prize for 2018, along with Professor Malin Falkenmark. The award goes to individuals or organizations that make "outstanding achievements in scientific research and in so doing help to solve global environmental problems."

In 2020 Walker was made an Officer (AO) in the General Division of The Order of Australia for "distinguished service to science, particularly to ecosystem ecology and research, and to professional scientific bodies."

References

External links
Profile on CSIRO webpage
Resilience Alliance
 Beijer Institute

Australian ecologists
Living people
Zimbabwean people of British descent
White Rhodesian people
Canadian emigrants to Australia
Systems ecologists
University of Natal alumni
University of Saskatchewan alumni
Academic staff of the University of Zimbabwe
Year of birth missing (living people)
Officers of the Order of Australia